Aleksandr Zuyev may refer to:
 Aleksandr Zuyev (footballer), Russian football player
 Aleksandr Zuyev (pilot) (1961–2001), Soviet and American pilot
Alexander Zuev (basketball)